A Nordic Poem is the first studio album of the musical project Folkearth. Because of the bad sound quality it was remastered and reissued. There was around 60 minutes of material, but some of it got lost.

Track listing
 "(Intro) The Pipes Are Calling" — 2:08
 "Wolfsong in Moonlight (Fenris Unbound)" — 4:40
 "Horned Trolls and Mystical Folk" — 5:28
 "Rhyming with Thunder" — 5:55
 "Eldritch Sorcery and Faery Runes" — 3:41
 "In Odin's Court" — 3:16
 "Storm Ravens Come" — 4:22
 "Gryningssång" — 2:30
 "Gaelic Valor" — 5:21
 "Outro" — 2:17

Line-Up

Instruments

Marios "Prince Imrahil" Koutsoukos (Dol Amroth) – keyboard
Stefanos Koutsoukos (Dol Amroth) – bass
Nikos Nezeritis (Dol Amroth) – acoustic guitar

Ruslanas – spoken vocal

Alex "Hugin" Wieser (Uruk-Hai) – keyboard

Athelstan (Forefather) – drums, electric guitar
Wulfstan (Forefather) – electric guitar, bass, vocal

Chrigiel Glanzmann (Eluveitie) – uilleann pipes, tin whistle, bodhrán

Magnus Wohlfart (Nae'blis) – acoustic and electric guitar, bass, keyboard, jaw harp, vocal
Jeremy Child (Yggdrasil) – drums, vocal
William Ekeberg (Broken Dagger) – cello, vocal
Jonas Fröberg (Trymheim) – keyed fiddle, vocal
Kristofer Janiec – violin
Michelle Maas – female vocal

Writing and production
all music except "(Intro) The Pipes Are Calling", "Rhyming With Thunder", and "Outro" by Magnus Wohlfart
music on "(Intro) The Pipes Are Calling" by Chrigel Glanzmann, additional arrangements by Magnus Wohlfart and Michelle Maass
music on "Rhyming With Thunder" by Athelstan and Wulfstan, additional arrangements by Magnus Wohlfart, Jonas Fröberg and William Ekeberg
music on "Outro" by Alex "Hugin" Wieser
all lyrics except "Gryningssång" by Marios Koutsoukos
lyrics for "Gryningssång" by Magnus Wohlfart
layout by Dragon Design

See also
 Prince Imrahil (Middle-earth)

References

2004 debut albums
Folkearth albums